Conolophia is a genus of moths in the family Geometridae.

Species
 Conolophia conscitaria (Walker, 1861)
 Conolophia helicola (Swinhoe, 1894)
 Conolophia melanothrix Prout, 1915
 Conolophia nigripuncta (Hampson, 1891)
 Conolophia persimilis (Warren, 1905)

References
 Conolophia at Markku Savela's Lepidoptera and Some Other Life Forms
 Natural History Museum Lepidoptera genus database

Desmobathrinae